Jia Qianqian (born 27 June 1987) is a Paralympian athlete from China competing mainly in F37 classification throwing events.

Jia first represented her country at a Paralympic Games in 2008 in Beijing, entering the shot put, javelin throw and discus throw events. Success was to follow at the 2012 Summer Paralympics in London, where she won her first Paralympic medal; a silver in the F37/38 javelin, recording a distance of 31.62 metres. As well as her Paralympic success Jia has won medals at the World Championships winning a silver in the Javelin in 2011 Games in Christchurch and a bronze, again in the javelin, at the 2015 Games in Doha.

Personal history
Jia was born in Zibo, China in 1987. She was born with an impairment to her right arm, and has cerebral palsy. She lives is Zibo and works as a doctor.

Notes

Paralympic athletes of China
Athletes (track and field) at the 2008 Summer Paralympics
Athletes (track and field) at the 2012 Summer Paralympics
Paralympic silver medalists for China
Living people
1987 births
Medalists at the 2012 Summer Paralympics
Chinese female discus throwers
Chinese female javelin throwers
Chinese female shot putters
Sportspeople from Zibo
Paralympic medalists in athletics (track and field)
21st-century Chinese women